FDJ Suez Futuroscope is a professional Women's road bicycle racing team which is based in France. The team competes in various UCI Women's road races.

The team uses the same equipment as the men's team, along with coaches and shared training camps. The team is sponsored by French lottery Française des Jeux (FDJ), French utility company Suez and French theme park Futuroscope.

Team
In July 2016, Française des Jeux (FDJ) announced they would initially co-sponsor the team until the end of the 2018 season. For the 2015 season the team announced the signings of Eugénie Duval, Aude Biannic, Greta Richioud and Séverine Eraud. Roxane Fournier, Pascale Jeuland, Lucie Pader, Charlotte Bravard and Amelie Rivat signed contract extensions with the team.

Team roster

Major results
Source:

2006
Stage 2 Grand Prix de France International, Marina Jaunâtre
 Grand Prix de France International Féminin, Marina Jaunâtre
Stage 1, Marina Jaunâtre
  Tour de Bretagne, Marina Jaunâtre
2007
GP Cholet — Pays de Loire, Marina Jaunâtre
Route Féminine Du Vignoble Nantais, Karine Gautard Roussel
Calan, Nathalie Jeuland
Saint-Amand-Mont-Rond, Karine Gautard Roussel
  Tour de Bretagne, Marina Jaunâtre
Stages 3 & 5a, Karine Gautard Roussel
Classic Féminine Vienne Poitou-Charentes, Emilie Blanquefort
2008
Route Féminine Du Vignoble Nantais, Karine Gautard Roussel
Saint Quentin les Anges, Nathalie Jeuland
Vitry aux Loges, Emilie Jeannot
Nazelles Negron, Emilie Jeannot
Duo Normand, Karine Gautard Roussel &  Emmanuelle Merlot
2009
GP Cholet — Pays de Loire, Florence Girardet
Besançon Cyclo-cross, Caroline Mani
2010
Saverne Cyclo-cross, Christel Ferrier-Bruneau
Miramas Cyclo-cross, Christel Ferrier-Bruneau
Saint-Jean-de-Monts, Cyclo-cross, Christel Ferrier-Bruneau
2012
GP Cholet — Pays de Loire, Audrey Cordon
2013
  Tour de Bretagne, Audrey Cordon
Stage 5 Tour de l'Ardèche, Karol-Ann Canuel
2014
Begijnendijk Road Race, Fiona Dutriaux
 Youth classification Tour de Bretagne Féminin, Lucie Pader
Stages 1 & 5 Trophée d'Or Féminin, Pascale Jeuland
2015
Grand Prix de Dottignies, Roxane Fournier
Stage 3 Tour of Chongming Island, Roxane Fournier
 Mountains classification Tour de Bretagne Féminin, Amelie Rivat
Stage 1 Tour Cycliste Féminin International de l'Ardèche, Roxane Fournier
2016
Stage 3 Tour of Zhoushan Island, Roxane Fournier
Stages 2 & 7 La Route de France, Roxane Fournier
2017
 Youth classification Tour de Feminin-O cenu Českého Švýcarska, Séverine Eraud
 Combativity classification Holland Ladies Tour, Stages 2 & 3, Eri Yonamine
Championnat Régional Centre (Pierres), Charlotte Bravard
Overall Tour de Charente-Maritime, Shara Gillow
Stages 1 & 2 (ITT), Shara Gillow
2018
Stage 5 Thüringen Rundfahrt der Frauen, Rozanne Slik
Grand Prix International d'Isbergues – Pas de Calais Feminin, Lauren Kitchen
2019
 Young rider classification Emakumeen Euskal Bira, Évita Muzic
La Périgord Ladies, Jade Wiel
2021
Stage 3 Vuelta a Burgos Feminas, Cecilie Uttrup Ludwig
2022
Amstel Gold Race, Marta Cavalli
Grand Prix Féminin de Chambéry, Brodie Chapman
La Flèche Wallonne Féminine, Marta Cavalli
 Overall Bretagne Ladies Tour, Vittoria Guazzini
 Mountains classification, Victorie Guilman
 Young rider classification, Vittoria Guazzini
Team classification
 Young rider classification Vuelta a Burgos Feminas, Évita Muzic
2023
Tour Down Under, Grace Brown
Cadel Evans Great Ocean Road Race, Loes Adegeest

National, continental and world champions

2006
 France U23 Time Trial, Karine Gautard Roussel
2007
 France Track (Points race),  Pascale Jeuland
 European Junior Track (Individual pursuit), Fiona Dutriaux
2008
 France Track (Points race),  Pascale Jeuland
2009
 France Track (Individual pursuit), Fiona Dutriaux
 France Track (Points race), Fiona Dutriaux
2010
 France Cyclo-cross, Caroline Mani
 World Track (Scratch race), Pascale Jeuland
 Canada Time Trial, Julie Beveridge
 France Track (Points race), Fiona Dutriaux
2012
 France Track (Omnium), Fiona Dutriaux
 France Road Race, Marion Rousse
 Austria Road Race, Andrea Graus
2014
 Australia Criterium, Sarah Roy
 France Track (Individual pursuit),  Pascale Jeuland
 France Track (Team pursuit), Pascale Jeuland
 France Track (Team pursuit), Roxane Fournier
 France Track (Team pursuit), Fiona Dutriaux
2015
 France Track (Team pursuit), Aude Biannic
 France Track (Team pursuit), Roxane Fournier
 France Track (Team pursuit), Pascale Jeuland
2016
 France Track (Omnium), Pascale Jeuland
2017
 Japan Time Trial, Eri Yonamine
 Japan Road Race, Eri Yonamine
 France Road Race, Charlotte Bravard
 France Track (Scratch race), Coralie Demay
 France Track (Omnium), Coralie Demay
 France Track (Individual pursuit), Coralie Demay
 France Track (Team pursuit), Coralie Demay
 France Track (Points race), Coralie Demay
2018
 France Track (Scratch race), Coralie Demay
 France Track (Omnium), Coralie Demay
 France Track (Individual pursuit), Coralie Demay
2019
 France Road Race, Jade Wiel
 France Track (Omnium), Clara Copponi
 France Track (Team pursuit), Clara Copponi
 Germany Track (Team pursuit), Charlotte Becker
 France Track (Individual pursuit), Coralie Demay
 France Track (Madison), Clara Copponi
 France Track (Madison), Coralie Demay
2021
 France Road Race, Évita Muzic
2022
 Australia Time Trial, Grace Brown

References

External links

Nouvelle-Aquitaine Futuroscope
Sport in Nouvelle-Aquitaine
Cycling teams based in France
UCI Women's Teams
Cycling teams established in 2006
2006 establishments in France